The Least You Should Know about English is a series of non-fiction textbooks by Paige Wilson and Teresa Ferster Glazier that focuses on students improving their basic spelling, grammar, and writing.

Usage 
It has been used in classrooms for over 35 years and, is in its twelfth edition.

It is used by the Institute of Education Sciences

References 

Language textbooks
English-language education

Books about writing